The Long Beach State Beach men's volleyball team is the NCAA Division I men's volleyball team for the Long Beach State University. Alan Knipe is the current head coach of 18 years, though he's been with the program since 2001.

Program record and history
{| class="wikitable"
|-
!Year
!Head Coach
!Overall  record
!Conference record
!Conference standing
!Postseason
|-

|-
| 1970
| Randy Sandefur
| 6–4
| 3–2
| 3rd
| NCAA Runners-up
|-
| 1971
| Randy Sandefur
| 5–4
| 2–3
| 4th
| NCAA Regionals
|-
| 1972
| Randy Sandefur
| 6–8
| 2–4
| 5th
| NCAA Regionals
|-
| 1973
| Randy Sandefur
| 15–3
| 9–2
| 1st
| NCAA Runners-up
|-
| 1974
| Randy Sandefur
| 3–10
| 3–10
| 6th
|
|-
| 1975
| Miles Pabst
| 2–10
| 2–10
| 6th
|
|-
| 1976
| Miles Pabst
| 5–7
| 5–7
| 5th
|
|-
| 1977
| Dick Montgomery
| 4–10
| 4–10
| 6th
|
|-
| 1978
| Dick Montgomery
| 13–6
| 9–5
| 4th
| NCAA Regionals
|-

|-
| 1979
| Dick Montgomery
| 14–9
| 9–9
| 6th
|
|-
| 1980
| Dick Montgomery
| 21–7
| 13–5
| 4th
|
|-
| 1981
| Don Paris
| 15–13
| 9–7
| 4th
| NCAA Regionals
|-
| 1982
| Ray Ratelle
| 15–15
| 4–12
| 7th
| NCAA Regionals
|-
| 1983
| Ray Ratelle
| 20–9
| 11–5
| 2nd
| NCAA Regionals
|-
| 1984
| Ray Ratelle
| 15–10
| 10–8
| 5th
| NCAA Regionals
|-
| 1985
| Ray Ratelle
| 14–19
| 3–15
| 9th
|
|-

|-
| 1986
| Ray Ratelle
| 19–15
| 7–13
| 7th
|
|-
| 1987
| Ray Ratelle
| 18–15
| 5–13
| 7th
|
|-
| 1988
| Ray Ratelle
| 20–14
| 8–10
| 6th
|
|-
| 1989
| Ray Ratelle
| 22–9
| 12–8
| 6th
|
|-
| 1990
| Ray Ratelle
| 28–7
| 14–2
| 1st
| NCAA Runners-up
|-
| 1991
| Ray Ratelle
| 31–4
| 14–2
| 2nd
| NCAA Champions
|-
| 1992
| Ray Ratelle
| 27–4
| 15–1
| 1st
|
|-

|-
| 1993
| Ray Ratelle
| 18–13
| 12–7
| 2nd
|
|-
| 1994
| Ray Ratelle
| 13–15
| 7–12
| 5th
|
|-
| 1995
| Ray Ratelle
| 18–9
| 12–7
| 3rd
|
|-
| 1996
| Ray Ratelle
| 21–6
| 15–4
| 2nd
|
|-
| 1997
| Ray Ratelle
| 19–10
| 12–7
| 2nd
|
|-
| 1998
| Ray Ratelle
| 22–7
| 13–6
| 2nd
|
|-
| 1999
| Ray Ratelle
| 22–4
| 17–2
| 1st
| 
|-
 
 
 
|-
| 2002
| Alan Knipe
| 13–18
| 9–13
| 7th
|
|-
| 2003
| Alan Knipe
| 17–13
| 11–11
| 8th
|
|-
 
|-
| 2005
| Alan Knipe
| 22–10
| 14–8
| 5th
|
|-
| 2006
| Alan Knipe
| 22–10
| 14–8
| 4th
|
|-
| 2007
| Alan Knipe
| 11–17
| 6–16
| 10th
|
|-
 
 
 
 
 
 
 
 
 
 

 
 
 
 
 
 

Team facts

Head coach
 1970–1974: Randy Sandefur
 1975–1976: Miles Pabst
 1977–1980: Dick Montgomery
 1981: Don Paris
 1982–2000: Ray Ratelle
 Ray Ratelle was the Head Coach for 19 seasons with an overall win–loss record of 385-190 (.670) and conference record of 207-137 (.602), with 3 Conference titles and 3 NCAA appearances. 1990 NCAA Finalist and in his tenth year, won the first ever Men's NCAA Championship team title of any sport in Long Beach State's history of athletics. Ratelle was also named Coach of the Year in both 1990 and 1991.
 2001–present: Alan Knipe
 Alan Knipe's win–loss record presently stands at 334-149 (.692 percentage).  He has been to the final four a total of eight times: twice as a player (1990, 1991) and six as a coach (2004, 2008, 2016, 2017, 2018 and 2019).  He was a member of Long Beach's—1991--NCAA Men's VB National Championship Team; coming up a game short in coaching the 2004 team to NCAA Runners-up, he coached the 49ers to its second and third NCAAchampionships in 2018 and 2019.  He was the head coach of the U.S. National Team, until 2012, and he returned to LBSU upon completing his service.

 Under him, Scott Touzinsky was a Long Beach State assistant coach.  Touzinsky was suspended by USA Volleyball in July 2018 because of a pending investigations by the United States Center for SafeSport. Since the NCAA doesn’t fall under SafeSport jurisdiction, Touzinsky wasn’t prohibited from coaching in college. The complaint against Touzinsky related to when Touzinsky was a player on the USA National Team. Touzinsky left the program in April 2019 after it was revealed he was sanctioned by the SafeSport following an investigation into allegations of sexual misconduct.

Conference
 1970–1978: SCIVA
 Overall Record (incomplete): 50–56
 1979–1985: CIVA
 Overall Record: 114–82
 1986–1992: WIVA
 Overall Record: 165–68
 1993–2017: Mountain Pacific Sports Federation (MPSF)
 Overall Record: @Good, ~79.5%
 2018–present: Big West Conference
 Overall Record: 19-1

Home court
The volleyball team played in the Goldmine gymnasium at CSULB until 1994.  Since November 30, 1994, the team has played at the Walter Pyramid.  The 18-story tall complex has played host twice to the NCAA Men's Volleyball Championships (2001, 2003).  Its infrastructure utilizes 18,000 steel tubes and connection modules.  It cost approximately $22 million to build.

National championships
 1991: NCAA by defeating USC

With an overall record of 31 wins and just 4 losses, the 1991 NCAA Men's Volleyball Champions swept three out of their five post-season opponents.  In the WIVA Tournament (Irvine, CA) the 49ers beat UCSB and SDSU 3–0 before overcoming county/national nemesis, the UCLA Bruins 3–2.  From there it was on to Hawaii for the '91 Final Four.  'the Beach' said aloha to Penn State in a clean sweep 3–0; they then needed an extra game winning 3–1 over longtime rival USC for their first national championship to date.

1991's team included these mentionable leaders: Alan Knipe, Brent Hilliard (NCAA Final Four MVP), Brett Winslow, Matt Lyles, Zach Small, Jason Stimpfig and Ray Ratelle (Asics/VB Mag. & AVCA C.O.Y.).  No other 'BEACH' Men's VB Team has ever won as many games as this singular team; they were a combined 89% in their win-lost ratio.

 2018: Won second NCAA title by defeating UCLA 3-2 (at Westwood, Los Angeles). They defeated Ohio State University (defending national champions) 3–1 in the semi-finals.

With co-Valuables Josh Tunaniga, JR-Setter AND TJ DeFalco, JR-Outside Hitter, eight thousand in the stands were treated to a thrilling five-setter match (in overtime) favoring the men of south L.A. county.
 2019: Won third NCAA title by defeating Hawaii 3-1 (at Long Beach). LB defeated Pepperdine University 3–1 in the semi-finals. Back to back national championships for the first time in school history.

Notable players
 Taylor Crabb – 2013 AVCA P.O.Y.; AVCA 2013 & 2014 1st Team All-American, 2012 Volleyball Magazine 3rd Team All-American 
 Bob Ctvrtlik – Asics/VB Mag. honorable mention All-American (1983), First U.S. Olympic Team Member/49er who won Olympic Medals in men's volleyball (1988, gold; 1992, bronze)
 Torey Defalco – a.k.a. The Brethren, T.J. DeFalco; 2017 and 2019 AVCA Player of the Year. Four-time AVCA First Team All-American
 Tyler Hildebrand – 4 yr starter who simultaneously doubled as the U.S. National Team's setter (2003–2012), three-time AVCA—and Asics/VB Mag.--1st Team All-American (2004–2006), all 3rd team MPSF 15th Yr. Anniversary Team.  Current Associate Coach (2013–present).
 Tim Hill – two-time all SCIVA Conference Player, AVP Hall of Famer
 Brent Hilliard – four-time All-American (1990 Asics/VB Mag. Freshman; AVCA 1st Team: 1991, 1992; AVCA 2nd Team: 1993; Asics/VB Mag. 1st Team: 1991–'93), 1992 AVCA National Player of the Year, MVP of 1991 Final Finals, all 1st team MPSF 15th Yr. Anniversary Team, U.S. Olympic Team Member (1992, Bronze Medalist). Hilliard's #7 jersey is retired hanging in LBSU's Pyramid.
 Tom Hoff – two-time AVCA—and Asics/VB Mag.--1st Team All-American (1995, 1996), U.S. Olympic Team Member (2000; 2004; 2008, gold medalist), all 2nd Team MPSF 15th Yr. Anniversary Team, Collegiate triple-doubles leader (K-B-D)
 Mark Kerins – Asics/VB Mag. 1st Team All-American (1990), Asics/VB Mag. 2nd Team All-American (1989), AVP Beach Pro (1993–2000), Senior captain of the most superior 49er men's team assembled in LBSU history.
 Alan Knipe – two-time AVCA—and Asics/VB Mag.--All-American (1991, 2nd team; 1992, 1st team), 2004 AVCA Coach of the Year (LBSU Men's VB), U.S. National Team Coach (2009–2012), 2017 MPSF C.O.Y.
 David Lee – 2004 AVCA 1st Team All-American, 2008 Olympic gold medalist.
 Paul Lotman – 2008 AVCA 1st Team All-American & National Player of the Year
 David McKenzie – three-time All-American (AVCA 2nd Team: 1999, AVCA 1st Team: 2000, 2001 & Asics/VB Mag. 2nd Team: 1999, Asics/VB Mag. 3rd Team: 2000), holds the NCAA record for kills in a game (58/106 attempts), all 3rd team MPSF 15th Yr. Anniversary Team, sibling to Joy Fuerbringer (class of 1993, NCAA National Women's VB Champion, AVCA All-American)
 Miles Pabst – two-time All-American who led the team to the 1973 NCAA Final Four, U.S. National Team Member, First 49er to return to LBSU as head coach (1975–1976)
 Dodge Parker – Pioneer from VB factory Punahou School ('69 class), 1986 LBSU Hall of Fame Inductee, NCAA Men's VB (1970, 1973) & International Volleyball Association's Star, U.S. National Team Member (1973–'80ish)
 Scott Touzinsky – 2001 MPSF Co-Freshman of the Year, 2004 AVCA First Team All-American, and 2004 NCAA All-Tournament, 2008 USA Olympic Gold Medalist
 Josh Tuaniga – 2018 NCAA MVB POY. Four-time AVCA All-American (2016–2019), 2016 Off the Block all-Freshman, inaugural 2018 BWCT MVP.    
 Brett Winslow''' – four-time All-American, 1996 Olympian and team captain of the 1991 national title squad. Winslow's #15 jersey is retired hanging in LBSU's Pyramid.

References

External links